Pangkalan Kerinci (Jawi: ڤڠكالن كرينچي ) is a town or Sub-district in Pelalawan Regency, of Riau province of Indonesia. The town is principal (capital) of Pelalawan Regency.

1993, Pangkalan Kerinci was a small village in the Sumatran rain forest. That year, four thousand workers commissioned by Sukanto Tanoto constructed a river port and a large logging mill there. At this time, the Kerinci Township was home to 200 households; a population that would grow to more than 200,000 by 2010 as APRIL Group's business expanded and diversified, transforming Kerinci into a social and commercial regional hub.

Commercial pulp production commenced in 1995, followed by commercial paper production in 1998. From the beginning, the region's growth would mirror the growth of APRIL Group's operations in Indonesia, with the Pelalawan Regency established in 1999, followed by the establishment of the Pelalawan Kerinci District with the Pelalawan Regency in 2001. Kerinci's continued growth would see its division into three areas in 2005.

In 2010, APRIL Group's forestry operations was measured to contribute 6.9% of Riau Province's total economic output. APRIL Group have created approximately 90,000 employment opportunities, which when coupled with its initiative to deliver better access to education and social support in areas such as healthcare and housing, has seen improved living standards and a reduction in poverty levels of 30%.

Climate
Pangkalan kerinci has a tropical rainforest climate (Af) with heavy rainfall year-round.

References 
																

aprilasia.com 

Populated places in Riau
Regency seats of Riau